The Danny Floro Philippine Basketball Association (PBA) Executive of the Year award is an annual Philippine Basketball Association (PBA) award given since the 1993 PBA season. The winner receives the Danny Floro Trophy, which is named since 1995 in honor of Valeriano "Danny" Floro, who owns the Crispa Redmanizers, one of the original members of the PBA which won two Grand Slam in 1976 and 1983. Unlike the traditional player awards, which is given by the league, this citation is awarded by the PBA Press Corps.

Since its inception, the award has been given to 17 individuals and one group. The most recent recipient of this award is Barangay Ginebra San Miguel team manager Alfrancis Chua.

List of awardees

Multiple time winners

Notes

References

Philippine Basketball Association awards
Awards established in 1993
1993 establishments in the Philippines